Louis-Jean Guyot  (7 July 1905 in Bordeaux in France – 1 August 1988 in Bordeaux) was a cardinal of the Catholic Church, and archbishop of Toulouse in 1966–1978.

In 1935 Guyot obtained a Doctorate in Sacred Theology from the Pontifical University of St. Thomas Aquinas, Angelicum with a dissertation entitled L'incorporation au Christ par les sacrements d'après la doctrine de st. Thomas.

He was made cardinal in 1973 by Pope Paul VI, named the cardinal-priest of Sant'Agnese fuori le mura.

He took part in the August 1978 Conclave which elected Pope John Paul I, and in the October 1978 Conclave which elected Pope John Paul II.

References

Archbishops of Toulouse
Participants in the Second Vatican Council
20th-century French cardinals
1905 births
1988 deaths
Cardinals created by Pope Paul VI